Eagle Falls can refer to:

In Australia - 
Eagle Falls (Kimberley)
In the USA
Eagle Falls (California)
Eagle Falls (Kentucky)
Eagle Falls (Washington)